The women's triple jump event at the 2015 European Athletics Indoor Championships was held on 7 March at 10:05 (qualification) and on 8 March at 16:25 (final) local time.

Medalists

Results

Qualification
Qualification: Qualification Performance 14.15 (Q) or at least 8 best performers (q) qualified for the final.

Final

References

2015 European Athletics Indoor Championships
Triple jump at the European Athletics Indoor Championships
2015 in women's athletics